The United States Lightship LV-87/WAL-512 (Ambrose) is a riveted steel lightship built in 1907 and served at the Ambrose Channel lightship station from December 1, 1908, until 1932, and in other posts until her decommissioning in 1966.  It is one of a small number of preserved American lightships, and now serves as a museum ship at the South Street Seaport Museum in southern Manhattan, New York City.

History 
In 1921, the first radio beacon in the United States was installed in the ship's radio shack. This addition greatly assisted ships navigating  the congested Ambrose Channel in dense fog.  LV-87 would also be the last steam-powered vessel to hold the Ambrose Channel post.

After the end of her Ambrose Channel assignment in 1932, LV-87 underwent a major refit, most significantly switching from steam propulsion to a direct drive Winton Diesel engine, as well as the removal of her anchor burton on her bow and a reorganization of her deck structures. Afterward, the ship was assigned to various posts which included being used as an examination vessel during World War II. Although her final post was at the Scotland Station she is commonly known by the name of her most famous station, Ambrose.

LV-87 was decommissioned on March 4, 1966, from the Coast Guard after 59 years of service. In 1968 she was given to the South Street Seaport Museum in Lower Manhattan. Currently she is moored at Pier 16 on the East River and is used as a floating exhibit.  In April 1989, the lightship was declared a National Historic Landmark.

References

External links

 U.S. Coast Guard Lightships & Those of the U.S. Lighthouse Service VESSEL DESIGNATION: LV 87/WAL 512

National Historic Landmarks in Manhattan
Lightships of the United States
Ships on the National Register of Historic Places in Manhattan
South Street Seaport
1907 ships
Museum ships in New York (state)
Ships built by New York Shipbuilding Corporation